The 20th Vuelta a España (Tour of Spain), a long-distance bicycle stage race and one of the three grand tours, was held from 29 April to 16 May 1965. Julio Jiménez won the mountains classification while Rik Van Looy won the points classification.

Teams and riders

Route

Results

References

External links
La Vuelta (Official site in Spanish, English, and French)

 
1965 in road cycling
1965
1965 in Spanish sport
1965 Super Prestige Pernod